Upper Richardson Lake and Lower Richardson Lake are impounded as a single reservoir by Middle Dam at the outlet to Rapid River on the western shore of the lower lake. Rapid River flows  to Umbagog Lake headwaters of the Androscoggin River. Upper Richardson Lake is in the western portion of Richardsontown township, and the lower lake is on the border of Magalloway Plantation and Maine Township C. Primary inflow is discharge over Upper Dam on Mooselookmeguntic Lake on the eastern shore of the upper lake. Smaller tributaries entering the north end of the upper lake include Mill Brook draining the Richardson Ponds, Fish Brook draining Fish Pond, and Beaver Brook draining Beaver Pond, Little Beaver Pond, and Aziscohos Pond. Other small tributaries include Rand Brook on the western shore, and Mosquito Brook, Metallak Brook, and Bailey Brook on the eastern shore. The lake offers excellent habitat for adult trout, but with dams on the outlet and major inlet, fish populations are limited by the insufficient spawning and nursery areas of these small tributaries.

Sources

Lakes of Oxford County, Maine
Reservoirs in Maine